Wang Erzhuo (Pinyin: Wáng Ěrzhuō) (born February 5, 1987 in Xi'an, Shaanxi) is a Chinese footballer who currently plays for Shaanxi Chang'an Athletic in the China League One division.

Club career
Wang Erzhuo began his football career playing for his hometown football club Shaanxi National Power in their youth team until the end of 2005 league season when the club went bankrupt and disbanded. Free to leave Wang Erzhuo would go out and have a trial for top tier side Xi'an Chanba International who recently moved their club into the Shaanxi province and impressed the club enough to achieve a professional contract with them, this move would also make him the only player from Shaanxi to actually play for the club. He would be drafted into the senior side during the 2006 league season and was given his league debut on August 8, 2007 against Wuhan Optics Valley F.C. where he came on as a substitute in a 2-0 victory. Under the club's manager Cheng Yaodong Wang would gradually start to establish himself within the team and go on to score his first league goal on September 29, 2006 against Tianjin Teda F.C. in a 4-2 victory. The following seasons saw Wang further establish himself within the midfield until he became a vital member within the club by the 2009 league season, however this was to prove to be a disappointing season for the club that saw them flirt with relegation and finish in a disappointing twelfth. Cheng Yaodong would also leave the club near the end of the season and Zhu Guanghu was brought in and would decide to drop Wang. At  the beginning of the 2010 league season Wang was still kept on, however unable to break back into the first team he was instead loaned out to Shenzhen Ruby.  

Before the 2012 season, Shaanxi decided to move to Guizhou and they changed their club name to Guizhou Renhe. Along with Zhang Chengxiang and Liao Linkun, Wang was loaned to China League Two club Shaanxi Laochenggen for the rest of the season in mid-July. He scored 5 goals in the Group Stage as Shaanxi Laochenggen finished 4th place in the North Group and entered the play-offs stage. However, Shaanxi lost to Guizhou Zhicheng 2–0 on aggregate in the quarter-finals and failed to promote to China League One. Wang was released by Guizhou Rehne in January 2013. He was signed by China League One side Chengdu Blades in February 2013.
In February 2014, Wang was loaned to Sichuan Longfor until the end of 2014 season. In March 2015, Wang transferred to China League One club Beijing BIT.
In March 2016, Wang transferred to China League Two club Tianjin Locomotive.

On 17 December 2016, Wang was signed by his hometown club Shaanxi Chang'an Athletic in the China League Two.

Career statistics
Statistics accurate as of match played 31 December 2020.

References

External links

Player stats at Sohu.com

1987 births
Living people
Sportspeople from Xi'an
Chinese footballers
Footballers from Shaanxi
Beijing Renhe F.C. players
Shenzhen F.C. players
Chengdu Tiancheng F.C. players
Sichuan Longfor F.C. players
Shaanxi Chang'an Athletic F.C. players
Chinese Super League players
China League One players
China League Two players
Association football midfielders